Somgogma Hermann Nikiema (born 30 November 1988) is a Burkinabé professional footballer who plays as a left-back for Salitas and the Burkina Faso national team.

International career
Nikiema made his debut with the Burkina Faso national team in a 2–1 2018 African Nations Championship qualification win over Ghana on 20 August 2017.

References

External links

1988 births
Living people
Sportspeople from Ouagadougou
Burkinabé footballers
Association football fullbacks
Burkina Faso international footballers
2021 Africa Cup of Nations players
Burkinabé Premier League players
Salitas FC players